Boris Szulzinger is a Belgian author, film director and producer. He is known for The Lonely Killers (1972) and Tarzoon: Shame of the Jungle (1975, directed with Picha). He was the founder of the group   Cinédit with Boris Lehman.

Filmography 
 The Big Bang (1987)
 Mama Dracula (1980) with Louise Fletcher
 Tarzoon, la honte de la jungle (1975)
... aka Jungle Burger (UK)
... aka Shame of the Jungle (USA)
... aka Tarzoon: Shame of the Jungle (USA)
 Les tueurs fous (1972)

... aka The Lonely Killers
 Nathalie après l'amour (1969) (as Michael B. Sanders)
... aka Love Under Age (USA)
... aka Nathalie After Love

References

External links

Year of birth missing (living people)
Living people
Belgian film directors
Pornographic animation